Quintrell Downs railway station serves the village of Quintrell Downs in Cornwall, England. The station is managed by Great Western Railway with local services in each direction all calling here.

History
The first railway here was a horse-worked line from Newquay Harbour to Hendra Crazey.  It was built by Joseph Treffry and completed in 1849.  The Cornwall Minerals Railway opened its line from Fowey to St Dennis Junction on 1 June 1874, where it connected with Treffry's Newquay Railway.  Although a siding was provided at an early date and passenger trains began passing through from 20 June 1876, the station at Quintrell Downs was not opened until 2 October 1911 (as Quintrell Downs Platform), by which time the line was part of the Great Western Railway. The suffix 'platform' in a GWR station name meant a staffed halt, and a member of staff remained until the gated level crossing was replaced by an open crossing in the 1990s. This crossing was upgraded to automatic half barriers in 2003-04.

Location 
All trains pause at this station when travelling in the up direction towards Par so that the level crossing can be activated. However, such stops are not available to passengers.

Services 

Quintrell Downs is the only intermediate station on the line to not be a request stop. The typical service is one train every two hours in each direction between Par and Newquay, with some services extending to Plymouth and one train in the summer extending to Penzance. There are few local services on summer Saturdays, when intercity trains run through to Newquay. Because of this, there is just one train per day in each direction due to the faster services running through to Newquay. Local trains are usually operated by Class 150 Sprinters.

Community rail
Local trains on the Newquay branch are designated as community rail services and are supported with marketing jointly provided by the Devon and Cornwall Rail Partnership and the franchised operator. The route is promoted as the "Atlantic Coast Line".

References

 
 
 

Railway stations in Cornwall
Former Great Western Railway stations
Railway stations in Great Britain opened in 1911
Railway stations served by Great Western Railway
DfT Category F2 stations